

Winners and nominees

1980s

1990s

2000s

2010s

2020s

Records 
 Most awarded actors: Ignacio López Tarso and Eric del Castillo, 3 times.
 Most nominated actors: Eric del Castillo with 9 nominations.
 Actors who have won all nominations: Alejandro Camacho, Carlos Ancira, Manuel "Flaco" Ibáñez, Jorge Russek and César Évora 2 times.
 Most nominated actors without a win: Miguel Manzano, Carlos Bracho and José Elías Moreno with 3 nominations.
 Youngest winner: César Évora, 52 years old.
 Youngest nominee: César Évora, 42 years old.
 Oldest winner: Luis Gimeno, 83 years old.
 Oldest nominee: Ignacio López Tarso, 91 years old.
 Actors winning after short time: Carlos Ancira by (Vivir un poco, 1986) and (El camino secreto, 1987), 2 consecutive years.
 Actors winning after long time: Joaquín Cordero by (Amor en silencio, 1989) and (Abrázame muy fuerte, 2001), 12 years difference.
 Actors that winning the award for the same role:
Jorge Martínez de Hoyos (El abuelo y yo, 1993) and Ignacio López Tarso (De pocas, pocas pulgas, 2003)
Joaquín Cordero (Amor en silencio, 1989) and Arturo Peniche (A que no me dejas, 2016)
Actors nominated for the same role without winning:
Augusto Benedico (Vivir un poco, 1985) and Joaquín Cordero (La madrastra, 2005)
Tito Guízar (Marimar, 1994) and Ignacio López Tarso (Corazón indomable, 2013)
 Actors winning this category, despite having been as a main villain:
 Carlos Ancira (Vivir un poco, 1986)
 Joaquín Cordero (Amor en silencio, 1989)
 Enrique Rocha (Dos mujeres, un camino, 1994)
 José Carlos Ruiz (Soñadoras, 1999)
 Carlos Cámara (Amor real, 2004)
 Julio Alemán (La verdad oculta, 2007)
 Arturo Peniche (A que no me dejas, 2016)
 Actors was nominated in this category, despite having played as a main villain:
 Sergio Ramos "El Comanche" (Seducción, 1987)
 Pedro Armendáriz, Jr. (La culpa, 1997)
 Enrique Lizalde (Esmeralda, 1998)
 César Évora (Abrázame muy fuerte, 2001)
 Eric del Castillo (Niña amada mía, 2003)
 Sergio Goyri (Mi pecado, 2010)
 Enrique Rocha (Corazón salvaje, 2010)
 Manuel Ojeda (Por ella soy Eva, 2013)
Foreign winning actors:
 Carlos Cámara from Dominican Republic
 Germán Robles from Spain
 Luis Gimeno from Uruguay
 César Évora from Cuba
 Alexis Ayala from United States

References

External links 
TVyNovelas at esmas.com
TVyNovelas Awards at the univision.com

Leading
Leading
Leading